The 1982 Major League Baseball season. Making up for their playoff miss of the year before, the St. Louis Cardinals won their ninth World Series championship, defeating the Milwaukee Brewers, four games to three.

Awards and honors
Baseball Hall of Fame
Hank Aaron
Happy Chandler
Travis Jackson
Frank Robinson

Other awards
Outstanding Designated Hitter Award: Hal McRae (KC)
Roberto Clemente Award (Humanitarian): Ken Singleton (BAL)
Rolaids Relief Man Award: Dan Quisenberry (KC, American); Bruce Sutter (STL, National).

Player of the Month

Pitcher of the Month

Statistical leaders

Standings

American League

National League

Postseason

Bracket

Home Field Attendance

Television coverage

Events
On May 6, 1982, Gaylord Perry of the Seattle Mariners became the fifteenth pitcher to win three hundred games when Seattle defeated the NY Yankees 7–3 at the Kingdome.
On May 30, Cal Ripken Jr. of the Baltimore Orioles plays the first of what would become a record-breaking 2,632 consecutive games by starting at third base against the Toronto Blue Jays.
On October 3, the San Francisco Giants eliminated the defending World Series champion Los Angeles Dodgers from playoff contention in favor of the Atlanta Braves. This was one of the few times a defending champion was eliminated on the final day of the regular season.
For the first time since 1959, no pitcher pitched a no-hitter.

Notes
Major League Baseball seasons since 1901 without a no-hitter pitched are 1909, 1913, 1921, 1927–1928, 1932–1933, 1936, 1939, 1942–1943, 1949, 1959, 1982, 1985, 1989, 2000 and 2005.

References

External links
1982 Major League Baseball season at ESPN
1982 Major League Baseball season schedule at Baseball Reference

 
Major League Baseball seasons